Pseudoepicoccum cocos is an ascomycete fungus that is a plant pathogen infecting coconut palms.

References

External links 
 Index Fungorum
 USDA ARS Fungal Database

Fungal plant pathogens and diseases
Coconut palm diseases
Ascomycota enigmatic taxa